is a public park located in the city of Nara, Japan, at the foot of Mount Wakakusa. Established in 1880, it is one of the oldest parks in Japan. Administratively, the park is under the control of Nara Prefecture. The park is one of the "Places of Scenic Beauty" designated by the Ministry of Education, Culture, Sports, Science and Technology (MEXT). Over 1,200 wild sika deer ( or  shika) freely roaming around in the park are also under designation of MEXT, classified as natural treasure.

While Nara Park is usually associated with the broad areas of the temples and the park proper, previously private gardens are now open to public. These gardens make use of the temple buildings as adjunct features of their landscapes.

The park is home to the Nara National Museum and Todai-ji, where the largest wooden building in the world houses a 15-metre (50 ft) tall statue of Buddha.

Deer

According to local folklore, sika deer from this area were considered sacred due to a visit from Takemikazuchi, one of the four gods of Kasuga Grand Shrine. He was said to have been invited from Kashima Shrine in present-day Ibaraki Prefecture, and appeared on Mount Mikasa (also known as Mount Wakakusa) riding a white deer. From that point, the deer were considered divine and sacred by both Kasuga Grand Shrine and Kōfuku-ji. Killing one of these sacred deer was a capital offense punishable by death up until 1637, the last recorded date of a breach of that law.

After World War II, the deer were officially stripped of their sacred/divine status, and were instead designated as natural monument ( Tennen kinenbutsu) and are protected as such. Today, visitors can purchase "deer-crackers" ( Shika-senbei) to feed the deer in the park. These crackers are exclusively sold by the WNOW company.

The number of deer grew in the postwar period to around 1,200 in 2008, leading to concerns about environmental and crop damage and discussion of culling. In 2016, a record number of 121 people were injured by deer. In 2016 it was announced that the area around Nara would be designated into four different zones, with the outer zones allowing deer to be captured and killed. In August 2017, traps were set to catch deer on the outskirts of Nara. The culling started in 2017, with a limit of 120 deer to be culled during 2017. In July 2017 there were around 1,500 deer living in the park, and at least 164 people had been injured by them from 2017 to 2018. Most of them were tourists feeding the deer.

In April 2018 Nara city set up new signs in English, Chinese and Japanese informing tourists that the deer are wild animals and to not tease them during feeding.

Due to the COVID-19 pandemic in 2020, the Japanese government implemented travel restrictions. The amount of tourists feeding the Nara deer decreased significantly. The deer lost a vital source of food and began to forage outside of the park. There were concerns that the deer could get hit by vehicles or die from eating harmful plastic and other litter.

In 2010 and 2021, deer were killed illegally and suspects were arrested.

In January 2023, a joint research team from Fukushima University, Yamagata University, and Nara University of Education revealed that among sika deer inhabiting the Kii Peninsula, those in Nara Park form a unique genetic population. The results of the large-scale genetic research showed that while 18 mitochondrial DNA genotypes were detected in deer living on the Kii Peninsula, only one of these genotypes was detected in deer living in Nara Park, which is not found in deer living in other areas of the Kii Peninsula. The genetic differentiation of the Nara Park deer from the Kii Peninsula deer population occurred about 1,400 years ago, which is genetically close to the year 768, when the Kasuga Grand Shrine was built. The results of this research confirm that the Japanese people have been protecting the deer in this area for more than 1,000 years as messengers of Takemikazuchi, the main deity of Kasuga Grand Shrine, and that this has allowed the deer in this area to maintain their population from generation to generation.

In popular culture
Alt-J's 2014 album, This Is All Yours has the track  "Nara"  which mentions Nara Park in its lyrics.

Gallery

References

External links

Official website(Japanese)
Nara Park, from The Official Nara Travel Guide

Nara, Nara
Places of Scenic Beauty
Urban public parks in Japan
Parks and gardens in Nara Prefecture
Buddhism in the Meiji period